Dominik Hładun (born 17 September 1995) is a Polish professional footballer who plays as a goalkeeper for Ekstraklasa club Legia Warsaw.

References

Polish footballers
1995 births
Living people
People from Lubin
Chojniczanka Chojnice players
Zagłębie Lubin players
Legia Warsaw players
Association football goalkeepers
Ekstraklasa players
I liga players